General Tucker may refer to:

Charles Tucker (British Army officer) (1838–1935), British Army lieutenant general
Charles E. Tucker Jr. (fl. 1980s–2000s), U.S. Air Force major general
Michael S. Tucker (burn 1954), U.S. Army lieutenant general
Reuben Henry Tucker III (1911–1970), U.S. Army major general
William F. Tucker (1827–1881), Confederate States Army brigadier general

See also
Attorney General Tucker (disambiguation)